The Samsung Galaxy S4 is an Android smartphone produced by Samsung Electronics as the fourth smartphone of the Samsung Galaxy S series and was first shown publicly on March 14, 2013, at Samsung Mobile Unpacked in New York City. It is the successor to the Galaxy S III, which maintains a similar design, but with upgraded hardware, more sensors, and an increased focus on software features that take advantage of its hardware capabilities—such as the ability to detect when a finger is hovered over the screen, and expanded eye tracking functionality, it was released the previous year. A hardware variant of the S4 became the first smartphone to support the emerging LTE Advanced mobile network standard (model number GT-i9506). The T-Mobile version of the Galaxy S4, named the model (SGH-M919), was released the same month. The phone's successor, the Samsung Galaxy S5, was released the next year.

The Galaxy S4 is among the earliest phones to feature a 1080p Full HD display, 1080p front camera video recording, and among few to feature temperature and humidity sensors and a touch screen able to detect a floating finger.

Sales and shipping 
The S4 was made available in late April 2013 on 327 carriers in 155 countries. It became Samsung's fastest selling smartphone and eventually Samsung's best-selling smartphone with 20 million sold worldwide in the first two months, and 40 million in the first six months.

In total, more than 80 million Galaxy S4 units have been sold, making it the most selling Android-powered mobile phone of all time.

The Galaxy S4's successor, the Samsung Galaxy S5, was announced by Samsung in February 2014 ahead of a release in April of that year.

Specifications

Hardware

Comparisons 
The Samsung Galaxy S4 uses a refined version of the hardware design introduced by the Samsung Galaxy S III, with a rounded, polycarbonate chassis and a removable rear cover. At the bottom of the device is a microphone and a micro USB port for data connections and charging; it also supports USB-OTG and MHL 2.0. Near the top of the device are a front-facing camera, an infrared transmitter for usage as universal remote control, proximity, and ambient light sensors, and a notification LED. In particular, the infrared sensor is used for the device's "Air View" features. A headphone jack, secondary microphone and infrared blaster are located at the top. The S4 is widely available in black and white color finishes; in selected regions, Samsung also introduced versions in red, purple, pink, brown with gold trim, and light pink with gold trim. In late January 2014, Samsung's Russian website briefly listed a new black model with a plastic leather backing, similar to the Galaxy Note 3.

The S4's  Super AMOLED display with 1080×1920 pixels (1080p Full HD) is larger than the  720×1280 display of its predecessor, and also features a Pen Tile RGBG matrix. The pixel density increased from 306 to 441 ppi, surfaced with Corning Gorilla Glass 3. An added glove mode option increases touch sensitivity to allow detecting touch input through gloves. The Galaxy S4 is Samsung's first and one of the earliest mobile phones of all time to feature a 1080p display.

Unlike previous models, the S4 does not contain FM radio support, citing the increased use of online media outlets for content consumption on mobile devices.

Camera 
The camera of the Galaxy S4 uses a 13-megapixel Sony Exmor RS IMX135 image sensor (4128×3096), later used on the Galaxy Note 3.

While the front cameras of the Galaxy S3 and Galaxy Note 2, both released in 2012, are only able to capture videos at up to 720p HD resolution, the front camera of the Galaxy S4 allows 1080p Full HD video recording for the first time in any Samsung mobile phone.

The image sensor of the front camera is a Samsung CMOS S5K6B2

Related section: Camera software

Sensors 
Like the Galaxy S3, the S4 is equipped with an accelerometer sensor, a gyroscope, a front-facing proximity sensor, digital compass and barometer.

Unlike the predecessor, the S4 is also equipped with a hall sensor for the S View cover, a self-capacitive touch screen layer for Air View and thermometer and hygrometer sensors, the last two of which only the Galaxy S4 and Galaxy Note 3 out of all historical Samsung flagship devices are equipped with.

International variants 
Galaxy S4 models use one of two processors, depending on the region and network compatibility. The S4 version for North America, most of Europe, parts of Asia, and other countries contains Qualcomm's Snapdragon 600 system-on-chip, containing a quad-core 1.9 GHz Krait 300 CPU and an Adreno 320 GPU. The chip also contains a modem which supports LTE. Other models include Samsung's Exynos 5 Octa system-on-chip with a heterogeneous CPU. The octa-core CPU comprises a 1.6 GHz quad-core Cortex-A15 cluster and a 1.2 GHz quad-core Cortex-A7 cluster. The chip can dynamically switch between the two clusters of cores based on CPU usage; the chip switches to the A15 cores when more processing power is needed, and stays on the A7 cores to conserve energy on lighter loads. Only one of the clusters is used at any particular moment, and software sees the processor as a single quad-core CPU. The SoC also contains an IT tri-core PowerVR SGX 544 graphics processing unit (GPU). Regional models of the S4 vary in support for LTE; for Exynos 5-based models, while the E300K/L/S versions support LTE, with the Cortex-A15 also clocked at 1.6 GHz. the GT-I9500 model does not. The S4 GT-I9505 includes a multiband LTE transceiver.

LTE-A (LTE+) variant GT-i9506 
On 24 June 2013, a variant supporting LTE Advanced (model number GT-i9506), the first commercially available device to do so, was announced for South Korea.
In December 2013, it was also shipped to Germany as Samsung Galaxy S4 LTE+, but only with Telekom and Vodafone branding.
It also was equipped with increased processing power by using the same CPU (Snapdragon 800) and GPU (Adreno 330) hardware as the Galaxy Note 3 SM-N9005, although no precluded  video recording capabilities beyond 1080p at 30fps.

Storage options 
The S4 comes with either 16 GB, 32 GB, 64 GB of internal storage, which can be supplemented with up to an additional 64 GB with a microSD card slot. Unofficially, the S4 microSD card slot supports 128 GB cards as well.  The S4 contains a 2600 mAh, NFC-enabled battery.

Software

Operating system 

The S4 was originally released with Android 4.2.2 and Samsung's TouchWiz Nature UX 2 interface.

Interaction 
The Galaxy S4 is known for introducing a range of new extended interaction features to the Samsung Galaxy S series.

Head tracking features have been extended on the S4, summarized as "Samsung SmartScreen". The new "Smart Scroll" feature can be used to scroll while looking at the screen by slightly tilting head or phone forward or backward, and "Smart Pause" allows the video player to pause videos if the user is not looking at the screen.  "Smart Rotation" tracks the facial orientation using the front camera to match the screen rotation and "Smart Stay" prevents entering stand-by mode by deactivating display time-out while the user is looking at it.

 and "Air Gestures" implement gestures and other functionality (such as previewing images in the Gallery, messages in the precluded SMS/MMS app, a preview of the contact name, number and details in speed dial on the telephone app's number pad, and a preview tooltip when hovering above the seek bar in the video player and showing) by holding or swiping a hand or finger slightly above the screen, similarly to Samsung's Galaxy Note series, and adds a feature known as "Quick Glance", which uses the proximity sensor to wake the phone so it can display the clock, notifications and status such as battery charge. Air Gestures can also be used to accept calls ("Air call-accept"), to scroll through pages ("Air Jump") and swipe through gallery pictured ("Air Browse") and to move home screen icons ("Air Move").

There are additional motion gestures, including panning through and zooming into/out of an image in the precluded gallery software by tilting the phone and holding with one or two fingers respectively.  To take a screenshot, alternatively to pressing the home button and power button simultaneously, a user can simply swipe their hand from one end of the screen to the other end horizontally.

These interaction features were later inherited by the Galaxy Note 3 and the Galaxy S5, but most of those features were gradually removed from Samsung's flagship phones released afterwards.

Camera software 
The camera app implements numerous new features (some of which were first seen on the Galaxy Camera), including an updated interface, and new modes such as "Drama" (which composes a moving element from multiple shots into a single photo), "Eraser" (which takes multiple shots and allows the user to remove unnecessary elements from a picture), "Dual Shot" (which uses the front-facing camera for a picture-in-picture effect), "Sound and Shot" (which allows the user to record a voice clip alongside a photo), "Animated Photo", and "Story Album" among others. Burst shots at full resolution are supported, but capped at twenty consecutive pictures at any selected resolution.

The S4 also supports High Efficiency Video Coding (HEVC), a next-generation video codec.

In addition, the Galaxy S4 is able to capture 9.6 Megapixel (4128×2322) still photos during 1080p video recording, even with enabled digital video stabilization.

While the camera viewfinder user interface of the 2012's Samsung Galaxy S3, Galaxy Note 2, the competing iPhone 5 and iPhone 5s require switching between photo and video modes, the viewfinder of the Galaxy S4 camera software shows the buttons for both photo and video capture simultaneously. The virtual buttons for video recording, photo capture and camera modes have a metallic texture.

A "remote viewfinder" feature allows casting the camera viewfinder and controls to a different unit through Wi-Fi Direct.

Accessibility 

The Galaxy S4 is equipped with a range of accessibility features such as TalkBack.

Miscellaneous 
The "Group Play" feature allows ad hoc sharing of files between Galaxy phones, along with multiplayer games and music streaming between S4 phones. The S4 also introduces Knox in the Android 4.3 update, a suite of features which implements a sandbox for enterprise environments that can co-exist with a user's "personal" data. Knox incorporates use of the ARM TrustZone extensions and security enhancements to the Android platform.

The TouchWiz keyboard application on the Galaxy S4 has a built-in clipboard feature that allows holding up to twenty items such as text and screenshots.

The precluded optical reader feature allows the optical character recognition of pictures through the camera or a picture stored in the gallery. The optical reader is also accessible through a menu in the keyboard for direct pasting into a text area.

Other new pre-loaded apps include WatchOn (an electronic program guide that can utilize the S4's infrared transmitter to be a remote control), S Translator, the workout tracker S Health, S Voice Drive, S Memo, TripAdvisor, and an optical character recognition app. The previous "Hub" apps from past Samsung devices were replaced by a single Samsung Hub app, with access to music, e-books, and games that can be purchased by users.

Updates 
A minor update was released in June 2013, restoring the ability to move apps to the SD card, and adding HDR video support among other tweaks.

In November 2013, Samsung began rolling out an update to Android 4.3 for the S4, notably adding the Bluetooth low energy support needed for compatibility with the Galaxy Gear smartwatch. However, Samsung halted the rollout following reports from Galaxy S III users that Samsung's version of 4.3 had caused instability and increased battery usage. The rollout was resumed in December 2013.

In February 2014, Samsung began rolling out an update to Android 4.4.2 "KitKat" for the S4; the update adds user interface tweaks such as a camera shortcut on the corner of the lock screen, options for setting default launcher and text messaging applications, support for printing, and a new location settings menu for tracking and controlling the use of location tracking by apps. It also makes significant changes to the handling of secondary storage on the device for security reasons; applications' access to the SD card is restricted to designated, app-specific directories only, while full access to internal primary storage is still allowed. Although this behavior has existed since Android 3.0 "Honeycomb", OEMs such as Samsung previously modified their distributions of Android to retain the previous behavior, allowing applications to have unlimited access to SD card contents.

In January 2015, Samsung began rolling out an update to Android 5.0.1 "Lollipop" in Russia and India, an update which brings all the features of Lollipop, such as enhanced performance and lockscreen, including a refined interface with a flatter and geometric look, as seen on the Galaxy S5. Samsung paused the rollout soon after, when users reported major bugs. The rollout continued in March 2015 starting with unlocked models in the UK, Nordic and Baltic countries and has since then spread to several other countries. US (starting with AT&T and Sprint) and Canadian Samsung Galaxy S4 models received Android 5.0.1 Lollipop update in April 2015.

Model variants 
Several different model variants of the S4 are sold, with most variants varying mainly in handling regional network types and bands. To prevent grey market reselling, models of the S4 manufactured after July 2013 implement a regional lockout system in certain regions, requiring that the first SIM card used on a European and North American model be from a carrier in that region. Samsung stated that the lock would be removed once a local SIM card is used. SIM format for all variants is Micro-SIM, which can have one or two depending on model.

Google Play Edition 
At the Google I/O 2013 keynote, Samsung and Google revealed that an edition of the U.S. S4 would be released on June 26, 2013 through Google Play, with the HTC One M7, Sony Xperia Z Ultra, Motorola Moto G, and HTC One M8 releasing later on. initially featuring stock Android 4.2.2, the phone later updated to 4.4.4, with Samsung provided updates; it has an unlockable bootloader (similar to Nexus devices) and supports LTE on AT&T and T-Mobile's networks. The model number is GT-I9505G.

Accessories 

At retail, the S4 is bundled with a USB cable, AC adapter, and in-ear headphones. The "S-View Cover" accessory "closes" the phone.  When this cover is detected (by a hall effect sensor), the time and battery are displayed in this cover's window area.

Reception

Critical reception 

While some users considered all new Galaxy S4 features innovative and legitimately useful, others called them feature creep or just gimmicks. Those features are, for example, Smart Pause, Smart Rotation, Smart Scroll, Air View, Air gesture, Story Album and Temperature and humidity sensors.
These features and sensors are available and optionally utilizable for users and software that needs them.Additionally, the Galaxy S4 is equipped with an “easy mode” that hides many features and increases the size of on-screen elements for easier readability for novice mobile phone users.

The S4 received many positive reviews, though some criticism. Gigaom's Tofel says he would recommend the S4 "without hesitation" and says that it's "Samsung's defining phone". ReadWrite's Rowinski described the phone as a "solid" and "first-rate smartphone", but criticised Samsung's use of "bloatware, pre-loaded apps and features that you will likely never use". TIME'''s McCraken says the S4 is a smartphone with everything; it has the biggest screen and the most built-in features. He wishes the S4 would mark the end of Samsung's plan to add too many new features with its flagship smartphones.

Technology journalist Walt Mossberg described the S4 as "a good phone, just not a great one". Mossberg wrote: "while I admire some of its features, overall, it isn’t a game-changer." He criticized the software as "especially weak" and "often gimmicky, duplicative of standard Android apps, or, in some cases, only intermittently functional." He urged readers to "consider the more polished-looking, and quite capable, HTC One, rather than defaulting to the latest Samsung."Consumer Reports named the S4 as the top smartphone as of May 2013 due to its screen quality, multitasking support, and built-in IR blaster.

Critics noted that about half of the internal storage on the S4's 16 GB model was taken up by its system software, using 1 GB more than the S III and leaving only 8.5 to 9.15 GB for the storage of other data, including downloaded apps (some of which cannot be moved to the SD card). Samsung initially stated that the space was required for the S4's new features, but following a report regarding the issue on the BBC series Watchdog'', Samsung stated that it would review the possibility of optimising the S4's operating system to use less local drive space in a future update. Storage optimizations were brought in an update first released in June 2013, which frees 80 MB of internal storage and restores the ability to move apps to the device's microSD card.

Commercial reception 
The S4 reached 10 million pre-orders from retailers in the first two weeks after its announcement. In the United States, this prompted Samsung to announce that due to larger than expected demand, the roll out of devices on U.S. carriers Sprint and T-Mobile would be slower than expected.

The S4 sold 4 million in 4 days and 10 million in 27 days making it the then fastest selling smartphone in Samsung's history (this has been eclipsed by the Galaxy S5). The Galaxy S III sold 4 million units in 21 days, the Galaxy S II took 55 days and the Galaxy S took 85 days.

Samsung shipped more than 20 million S4 smartphones by June 30, which is around 1.7 times faster than the Galaxy S III.
As of October 23, 2013, Samsung has sold over 40 million S4 units six months after release.

Battery problems and safety issues 

A house in Hong Kong is alleged to have been set on fire by an S4 in July 2013, followed by a minor burnt S4 in Pakistan. A minor fire was also reported in Newbury, United Kingdom in October 2013. Some users of the phone have also reported swelling batteries and overheating; Samsung has offered affected customers new batteries free of charge.

On December 2, 2013, Canadian Richard Wygand uploaded a YouTube video describing his phone combusting. The phone was plugged into AC power overnight; he woke up to the smell of smoke and burning matter. In the video, the power cord was shown to be severely burnt and showed warped damage to the power plug. Later in the video, Wygand describes how he attempted to get a replacement:

In his second video, uploaded a few days after the first one, Wygand states that in order to receive a replacement phone, Samsung allegedly asked him to sign a legal document requiring him to remove the video, remain silent about the agreement, and surrender any future claims against the company. It is unknown whether or not he signed the document, but his frustrations had been expressed in his video. In an interview with Mashable, Wygand said that since he posted the second video, no further response from Samsung was received. However, an official spokesman from Samsung told Mashable, "Samsung takes the safety and security of our customers very seriously. Our Samsung Canada team is in touch with the customer, and is investigating the issue."

In the UK, companies which sold the S4 have varied in their reactions to claims by worried customers for replacement batteries under the Sale of Goods Act. Amazon, for example, have simply refunded part of the purchase price to allow for the cost of a replacement battery. O2 however insist that the complete phone, with the faulty battery, be returned to them so that they in turn can send it to Samsung to consider the claim.

See also 
 Comparison of Samsung Galaxy S smartphones
 Comparison of smartphones

References

External links 

 

Android (operating system) devices
Discontinued flagship smartphones
Samsung smartphones
Samsung Galaxy
Mobile phones introduced in 2013
Discontinued smartphones
Mobile phones with user-replaceable battery
Mobile phones with infrared transmitter
Mobile phones with self-capacitive touch screen layer